Blue Highway is an American contemporary bluegrass band formed in 1994 and based in Tennessee. The band's albums include Wondrous Love (2003), Marbletown (2005), and Original Traditional (2016).

Background
After helping found the band Dusty Miller, which was the 1990 SPBGMA International Bluegrass Band champion, and being a member (1990–92) of Alison Krauss & Union Station, Kingsport, Tennessee native Tim Stafford helped organize Blue Highway with Wayne Taylor in 1994. The group's first project, It's a Long, Long Road, "spent six months at the top of the Bluegrass Unlimited charts and won IBMA's Album of the Year Award (1996)." Jason Burleson, the original banjo player with the group and a multi-instrumentalist, is a native of Newland, North Carolina., Rob Ickes, a Northern California native, moved to Nashville in 1992 and joined as a founding member in 1994. Ickes has won numerous awards for his playing, and after a 21-year run with the band he announced his departure on November 18, 2015. Ickes was replaced by resonator guitarist and Virginia native, Gaven Largent. Vocalist, fiddler, and mandolin player Shawn Lane joined the group as a founding member after cutting "his musical teeth" in the bands of Ricky Skaggs and Doyle Lawson. Lane's songs have also been recorded by Ricky Skaggs, Ronnie Bowman, Mountain Heart, Blue Ridge, and other groups. Lead singer Wayne Taylor, who plays bass, hails from Southwest Virginia and is also a founding member of the group.

Awards and honors
Grammy nominations
 Best Bluegrass Album (2005): Marbletown
 Best Southern, Country or Bluegrass Gospel Album (2004): Wondrous Love
 Best Bluegrass Album (2016): Original Traditional

International Bluegrass Music Association Awards
 Song of the Year (2008): "Through the Window of a Train"
 Vocal Group of the Year (2012)
 Gospel Recording of the Year (1997): "God Moves in a Windstorm"
 Gospel Recording of the Year (2004): "Wondrous Love"
 Emerging Artist of the Year (1996)
 Album of the Year (1996): It's a Long, Long Road
 Album of the Year Award (2006): Celebration of Life: Musicians Against Childhood Cancer
 Songwriter of the Year (2014, 2017): Tim Stafford 
 Dobro Player of the Year (2010, 2009, 2008, 2007, 2006, 2004, 2003, 2000, 1999, 1998, 1997, 1996): Rob Ickes

Society for the Preservation of Bluegrass Music of America Awards
 Gospel Group of the Year (Overall) (2005)
 Instrumental Group of the Year (2003)
 Dobro Performer of the Year (2003): Rob Ickes
 Bass Performer of the Year (2001): Wayne Taylor
 Guitar Performer of the Year (2001, 2015): Tim Stafford

Dove Award
 Best Bluegrass Album (2004): Wondrous Love

Personnel

Current members
 Jason Burleson – banjo, guitar, mandolin
 Shawn Lane – mandolin, fiddle, guitar, vocals
 Tim Stafford – guitar, vocals
 Wayne Taylor – bass, vocals
 Gary Hultman – resonator guitar, vocals

Former members
 Rob Ickes – resonator guitar
 Tom Adams – banjo
 Gaven Largent – resonator guitar
 Justin Moses – resonator guitar

Discography

Albums

References

External links
 
 
 

Musical groups established in 1994
Rebel Records artists
Rounder Records artists
American bluegrass music groups
Country music groups from Tennessee
Musical groups from Nashville, Tennessee